HealthShare Exchange (HSX) is a membership-dues-supported nonprofit health information exchange formed in 2009 and incorporated in 2012 by Greater Philadelphia’s hospitals, health systems, and healthcare insurers.[1][2] It links the electronic medical record (EMR) systems of different hospital health systems and other healthcare providers — and the claims data of healthcare insurers — to make this information accessible at inpatient and outpatient points of care (including medical practice offices) and for care management. HSX services provide recent clinical care information, and alert providers and health plans to care events.[2] Health information exchange makes patient care more informed and coordinated, and reduces unnecessary care and readmissions.  HSX serves the greater Delaware Valley region, including southeastern Pennsylvania and southern New Jersey.[2]

Background 
As a result of the federal Health Information Technology for Economic and Clinical Health Act and other regional healthcare drivers, local planning for HSX began in the summer of 2011. The Health Care Improvement Foundation (HCIF), a regional quality improvement non-profit organization, joined with hospitals, health plans, physicians, government representatives, and safety-net providers to explore how a formalized health information organization could enable better care for patients in the region.

Resulting from a number of healthcare market drivers and challenges, HealthShare Exchange was formed as a collaboration among major healthcare stakeholders, including health plans and the acute care hospitals across the five-county region of Bucks, Chester, Delaware, Montgomery, and Philadelphia counties.

In May 2016, HSX was awarded a portion of a $3.8 million grant by the Pennsylvania eHealth Partnership Authority, which receives its funding through the Centers for Medicare and Medicaid Services. The Centers for Medicare and Medicaid Services runs an EHR incentive program that requires its participants to exchange health data in order to receive incentive payments.

Members 
HSX members include hospitals, health systems, ambulatory care practices, behavioral health organizations, health plans, and post-acute care facilities.

Health systems and hospitals 
 HSX health system and hospital members included:
 Crozer-Keystone Health System: Chester Medical Center, Delaware County Memorial Hospital, Springfield Hospital, & Taylor Hospital
 Doylestown Health: Doylestown Hospital
 Einstein Healthcare Network: Elkins Park, Montgomery, Philadelphia, & Moss Rehab
 Grand View Health: Grand View Hospital
 Hahnemann University Hospital
 Holy Redeemer: Holy Redeemer Hospital
 Jefferson Health: Abington Memorial Hospital, Abington Lansdale Hospital, Jefferson Hospital for Neuroscience, Methodist Hospital, Thomas Jefferson University Hospital, & Aria Health (Bucks, Frankford, and Torresdale Campuses)
 Main Line Health: Bryn Mawr Hospital, Lankenau Medical Center, Paoli Hospital, Riddle Hospital, & Bryn Mawr Rehab
 Penn Medicine: Chester County Hospital, Hospital of the University of Pennsylvania, Presbyterian Medical Center, Pennsylvania Hospital
 Physicians Care Surgical Hospital
 Prime Healthcare: Suburban Community Hospital, Roxborough Memorial Hospital, & Lower Bucks Hospital
 Rothman Orthopaedic Specialty Hospital
 St. Christopher's Hospital for Children
 Temple Health: Jeanes Hospital, Temple University Hospital, & Fox Chase Cancer Center
 The Children's Hospital of Philadelphia
 Trinity Health: St. Mary Medical Center & Mercy Health System (Mercy Fitzgerald, Mercy Philadelphia, and Nazareth Hospitals)

Health Plan Members 
 HSX healh plan members included:
 AmeriHealth Caritas
 AmeriHealth New Jersey
 Health Partners Plans
 Independence Blue Cross

References 

Medical and health organizations based in Pennsylvania